Mohanakalyani is a rāgam in Carnatic music (musical scale of South Indian classical music). It is a janya rāgam (derived scale) from the 65th melakarta scale Mechakalyani. It is a janya scale, as it does not have all the seven swaras (musical notes) in the ascending scale. It is a combination of the pentatonic scale Mohanam and the Melakarta raga scale Kalyani.
This ragam can be considered as a Prati Madhyamam equivalent of Bilahari, the janya of 29th Melakartha Dheerashankarabharanam. 
The equivalent of Mohanakalyani in Hindustani music is Bhoop Kalyan or Shuddha Kalyan. Bhoop Kalyan belongs to the Kalyan thaat of Hindustani music. Similar to Mohanakalyani, Bhoop Kalyan is a combination of Bhoop and Kalyan. This rāgam is believed to be invented by Swati Tirunal Maharaja.

Structure and Lakshana 
Mohanakalyani is an asymmetric rāgam that does not contain madhyamam or nishādham in the ascending scale. It is an audava-sampurna rāgam (or owdava rāgam, meaning pentatonic ascending scale). Its  structure (ascending and descending scale) is as follows:

 : 
 : 

The notes used in this scale are shadjam, chathusruthi rishabham, antara gandharam, panchamam and chathusruthi dhaivatham in ascending scale, with kakali nishadham and prati madhyamam included in descending scale. For the details of the notations and terms, see swaras in Carnatic music.

Popular compositions
A few compositions have been set to Mohanakalyani rāgam. Here are some popular kritis composed in Mohanakalyani.

Sangeetha Samrajya Sancharini By Bengaluru Ramamurthy Rao
Seve Srikantham by Swati Tirunal
Siddhi vinayakam seveham by Muthiah Bhagavatar
Bhuvaneshwariya by Muthaiya Bhagavathar
Sri Dharma Shastharam by Thulaseevanam R. Ramachandran Nair
Thaka thajanu theemtha, a thillana by Lalgudi Jayaraman
Aadinaye Kanna by Ambujam Krishna sung by Smt. M. L. Vasanthakumari
Tamaddam Taggadaiyya by Lalgudi Gopala Iyer
Hariya Bhajane mado, Baro Murari by Vadiraja Tirtha

Film Songs

Language:Tamil

Related rāgams 
This section covers the theoretical and scientific aspect of this rāgam.

Scale similarities 
Mohanam has a symmetric pentatonic scale, with the notes same as the ascending scale of Mohanakalyani. Its  structure is S R2 G3 P D2 S : S D2 P G3 R2 S
Bilahari is a rāgam which has the shuddha madhyamam in descending scale (descending scale of Shankarabharanam) in place of the prati madhyamam. Its  structure is S R2 G3 P D2 S : S N3 D2 P M1 G3 R2 S

Notes

References

Janya ragas